The 2012–13 ProA was the 6th season of the ProA, the second level of basketball in Germany. SC Rasta Vechta won the league and promoted to the Basketball Bundesliga by winning 2–0 in the Finals over Gloria Giants Düsseldorf.

Standings

|}

Playoffs

Awards
Player of the Year:  Richie Williams (SC Rasta Vechta)
Young Player of the Year:  Akeem Vargas (BG Göttingen)
Coach of the Year:  Patrick Elzie (SC Rasta Vechta)

Statistical leaders

Points

Rebounds

Assists

References

ProA seasons
Germany
2012–13 in German basketball leagues